The Camelot River is a river of Fiordland National Park, New Zealand. It is formed from the confluence of the Elaine Stream and Cozette Burn and flows west into the Gaer Arm of Kaikiekie / Bradshaw Sound.  The estuary is protected by the Kutu Parera (Gaer Arm) Marine Reserve.

See also
List of rivers of New Zealand

References
Land Information New Zealand - Search for Place Names

Rivers of Fiordland